Holcocera immaculella is a moth in the family Blastobasidae. It is found in North America, including Ontario, Quebec, Alabama, Arizona, British Columbia, Florida, Maine, Manitoba, Massachusetts, Minnesota, New Brunswick, New York and Tennessee.

The larvae feed on the seeds of Picea species.

References

Moths described in 1930
immaculella